Dr Anna Ritchie OBE, BA, PhD, FSA, Hon FSA Scot (née Bachelier, born 28 September 1943) is a British archaeologist and historian.

Education 
Her interest in archaeology began as a young student at Woking Girls’ Grammar School in the 1950s. The school had a small collection of Roman and Egyptian artefacts which the young Anna curated, catalogued and redisplayed. In an interview with the Egypt Centre at Swansea University, she recalled, 'the artefacts were displayed in a shelved case in the main entrance hall of the school, and I loved looking after them. You are right in thinking that I compiled the first inventory, and indeed that the museum was a spur to my future as an archaeologist.' She received her BA from Cardiff University and completed her PhD at the University of Edinburgh in 1970.

Career 
Beginning her career in the late 1960s, she has researched and published widely in academic and popular publications. In 1968, she married fellow archaeologist J N Graham Ritchie in 1968, (died 2005) and the couple had two children. She and her husband often collaborated on fieldwork, research and writing projects, including Scotland: Archaeology and Early History (1981), the Oxford Archaeological Guide to Scotland (1998) and The Ancient Monuments of Orkney, published in 1978.   
 
In the 1970s she directed excavations at three major archaeological sites in Orkney - the Pictish and Viking farmstead at Buckquoy in Birsay, the Neolithic farmstead of Knap of Howar on Papa Westray and a Neolithic chambered cairn on the Holm of Papa Westray. As well as publishing widely in academic journals and books, Ritchie has also written extensively for more popular publications. She has authored numerous guidebooks and publications for the HMSO and Historic Environment Scotland, covering topics such as Scottish Prehistory, Picts, Vikings, early Medieval sculpture and place-focused works on the archaeology of Iona, Orkney, Shetland, and Bute. She was a panellist on a 1971 episode of the television show Animal, Vegetable, Mineral, discussing the Viking Age. She has also acted as a consultant for the television series Time Team and Blood of the Vikings.

She was the first woman president of the Society of Antiquaries of Scotland (1990–93), was Vice-President of the Society of Antiquaries (London) and received an OBE for her services to archaeology in 1997. She has also served as a trustee of the National Museum of Scotland and the British Museum, and has been a long-standing supporter of heritage organisations the SCAPE Trust, Groam House Museum and The Govan Stones.

In January 2022 The Scottish Society for Northern Studies and the Pictish Arts Society announced a conference to be held in her honour in March 2022. The proceedings of the virtual conference are intended to be published as a festschrift, and the papers as delivered were made available to view online.

Publications

Selected books 
Ritchie, J.N.G. & A. (1972). Edinburgh and South East Scotland. Heinemann. 

Ritchie, A. (1977). The Kingdom of the Picts. Chambers. 

Ritchie, G. & Ritchie, A. (1981). Scotland: Archaeology and History. Thames & Hudson. 

Ritchie, A. (1985). ‘Orkney in the Pictish Kingdom’, in Renfrew, C (ed) The Prehistory of Orkney, 183–204. Edinburgh University Press.

Ritchie, A. (1985). Orkney and Shetland (Exploring Scotland’s Heritage), HMSO. 

Ritchie, A. (1986). Brough of Birsay, HMSO. 

Ritchie, A. (1988). Scotland BC: An Introduction to the Prehistoric Houses, Tombs, Ceremonial Monuments and Fortifications in the Care of the Secretary of State for Scotland. HMSO. 

Ritchie, A. (1989). Picts: an introduction to the life of the Picts and the carved stones in the care of the Secretary of State for Scotland. HMSO. 

Ritchie, A. & Breeze, D. J. (1991). Invaders of Scotland: Introduction to the Archaeology of the Romans, Scots, Angles and Vikings. HMSO. 

Ritchie, A. (1993). Viking Scotland. Historic Scotland.

Ritchie, A. (1993). The Ancient Monuments of Orkney. Historic Scotland. 

Ritchie, A. (ed) (1994). Govan and its early medieval sculpture. Sutton. 

Ritchie, A. (1994). Perceptions of the Picts: from Eumenius to John Buchan. Groam House Museum Trust. 

Ritchie, A. (1995). Prehistoric Orkney. Historic Scotland/Batsford. 

Ritchie, A. (1996). Orkney (Exploring Scotland’s Heritage). HMSO. 

Ritchie, A. (1997). Iona. Historic Scotland. 

Ritchie, A. (1997). Shetland (Exploring Scotland’s Heritage). HMSO. 

Ritchie, A. (1997). Meigle Museum: Pictish Carved Stones. Historic Scotland. 

Ritchie, A. & G. (1998). Scotland: An Oxford Archaeological Guide. Oxford University Press. 

Ritchie, A. 1999. Govan and its carved stones. Pinkfoot Press. 

Ritchie, A. (ed) (2000). Neolithic Orkney in its European Context. McDonald Institute Monograph, Cambridge. 

Ritchie, A. & Fisher, I. (2001). Iona Abbey and Nunnery. Historic Scotland. 

Ritchie, A. (2004). Hogback gravestones at Govan and beyond. Friends of Govan Old. 

Downes, J. & Ritchie A. (eds) (2006). Sea Change: Orkney and Northern Europe in the Later Iron Age AD 300-800. Orkney Heritage Society. 

Ritchie, A, Scott, I. G. & Gray, T. E. (2006). People of Early Scotland. Pinkfoot Press. 

Scott, I. G. & Ritchie, A. (2009). Pictish and Viking-Age Carvings from Shetland. RCAHMS. 

Ritchie, A. (2009). On the Fringe of Neolithic Europe. Society of Antiquaries of Scotland. 

Ritchie, A. (2011). A Shetland Antiquarian: James Thomas Irvine of Yell. Shetland Amenity Trust. 

Ritchie, A. (ed) (2012). Historic Bute: Land and People. Scottish Society for Northern Studies.

References

External links 
Scottish Society for Northern Studies website: Anna Ritchie Bibliography
Archaeology Data Service: Anna Ritchie ADS Library

Scottish archaeologists
Scottish women archaeologists
1943 births
Living people
Alumni of Cardiff University
Alumni of the University of Edinburgh
Members of the Order of the British Empire
Fellows of the Society of Antiquaries of London
Fellows of the Society of Antiquaries of Scotland